On 24 and 25 February 2021, bandits killed 36 people in Kaduna and Katsina State of Nigeria.

The series of armed attacks were perpetrated by a gang of bandits in villages in Kaduna and Katsina states in Nigeria. The gunmen burned down houses, killing 18 people in each state and injuring several others.

After a further attack killed 7 more, another source put the total death toll at 97.

References

2021 murders in Nigeria
2020s massacres in Nigeria
February 2021 Katsina attacks
21st century in Katsina State
Arson in Nigeria
Arson in the 2020s
Attacks on buildings and structures in 2021
Attacks on buildings and structures in Nigeria
February 2021 Katsina attacks
Crime in Katsina State
February 2021 crimes in Africa
Mass murder in 2021
Violent non-state actor incidents in Nigeria
Attacks in Nigeria in 2021